James Tracy Rogers (April 18, 1864 – August 30, 1929) was an American lawyer and politician from New York.

Life
He was born on April 18, 1864, in Owego, Tioga County, New York. He attended Owego Free Academy. He was Assistant Postmaster of Owego for six years. Then he studied law with County Judge Howard J. Mead, and worked as Clerk of the Surrogate's Court of Owego County and Clerk of the Village of Owego. He enrolled at Cornell Law School, was admitted to the bar in September 1892, graduated LL.B. from Cornell in 1893, and began the practice of law in Syracuse. In 1894, he moved to Binghamton and practiced law there.

Rogers was a member of the New York State Assembly in 1899, 1900, 1901, 1902, 1903, 1904, 1905, 1906 and 1907. He was Chairman of the Committee on Excise in 1900; Chairman of the Committee on Electricity, Gas and Water Supply in 1901; Chairman of the Committee on the Judiciary in 1902; Majority Leader and Chairman of the Committee on Ways and Means from 1903 to 1905; and Chairman of the Committee on Insurance in 1906 and 1907.

On February 29, 1912, he married Emily (Lodge) Grummond (died 1917).

On October 14, 1920, he married Ethel Coffin Drew, and they had one son.

He died on August 30, 1929; and was buried at the Floral Park Cemetery in Johnson City.

Sources

External links

1864 births
1929 deaths
People from Owego, New York
Politicians from Binghamton, New York
Republican Party members of the New York State Assembly
Cornell Law School alumni
Lawyers from Binghamton, New York
19th-century American lawyers